Artemisina is a genus of sponges belonging to the family Microcionidae.

The genus has cosmopolitan distribution.

Species:

Artemisina amlia 
Artemisina apollinis 
Artemisina archegona

References

Poecilosclerida
Sponge genera